Riedel is an impact crater on the far side of the Moon. It is located to the north-northeast of the crater Karrer, and due south of Leavitt.

This is a worn crater with smaller craters along the rim to the north and southwest. There is a small craterlet along the southern inner wall. The interior floor appears relatively free of distinguishing features, with only a small craterlet in the southern part of the floor.

Satellite craters
By convention these features are identified on lunar maps by placing the letter on the side of the crater midpoint that is closest to Riedel.

References

 
 
 
 
 
 
 
 
 
 
 
 

Impact craters on the Moon